The 33rd American Society of Cinematographers Awards was held on February 9, 2019, at the Hollywood & Highland Ray Dolby Ballroom, honoring the best cinematographers of film and television in 2018.

The nominees for film and television were announced on January 7, 2019.

Winners and nominees

Board of Directors Award
 Awarded to actor Jeff Bridges.

Film

Outstanding Achievement in Cinematography in Theatrical Release
 Łukasz Żal, PSC – Cold War
 Alfonso Cuarón – Roma
 Matthew Libatique, ASC – A Star Is Born
 Robbie Ryan, BSC, ISC – The Favourite
 Linus Sandgren, ASC, FSF – First Man

Spotlight Award
The Spotlight Award recognizes outstanding cinematography in features and documentaries that are typically screened at film festivals, in limited theatrical release, or outside the United States.

 Giorgi Shvelidze – Namme
 Joshua James Richards – The Rider
 Frank van den Eeden, NSC, SBC – Girl

Television

Outstanding Achievement in Cinematography in Regular Series for Non-Commercial Television
 Adriano Goldman, ASC, ABC, BSC – The Crown (Episode: "Beryl") (Netflix)
 Gonzalo Amat – The Man in the High Castle (Episode: "Jahr Null") (Amazon)
 David Klein, ASC – Homeland (Episode: "Paean to the People") (Showtime)
 Colin Watkinson, ASC – The Handmaid's Tale (Episode: "The Word") (Hulu)
 Cathal Watters, ISC – Peaky Blinders (Episode: "The Company") (Netflix)
 Zoë White, ACS – The Handmaid's Tale (Episode: "Holly") (Hulu)

Outstanding Achievement in Cinematography in Regular Series for Commercial Television
 Jon Joffin, ASC – Beyond (Episode: "Two Zero One") (Freeform)
 Nathaniel Goodman, ASC – Timeless (Episode: "The King of the Delta Blues") (NBC)
 Ben Richardson – Yellowstone (Episode: "Daybreak") (Paramount Network)
 David Stockton, ASC – Gotham (Episode: "A Dark Knight: Queen Takes Knight") (Fox)
 Thomas Yatsko, ASC – Damnation (Episode: "A Different Species") (USA Network)

Outstanding Achievement in Cinematography in Television Movie, Miniseries, or Pilot
 James Friend, BSC – Patrick Melrose (Episode: "Bad News") (Showtime)
 Mathias Herndl, AAC – Genius: Picasso (Episode: "Chapter 1") (NatGeo)
 Florian Hoffmeister, BSC – The Terror (Episode: "Go for Broke") (AMC)
 M. David Mullen, ASC – The Marvelous Mrs. Maisel (Episode: "Pilot") (Amazon)
 Brendan Steacy, CSC – Alias Grace (Episode: "Part 1") (Netflix)

Other awards
 Lifetime Achievement Award: Robert Richardson, ASC
 Career Achievement in Television: Jeffrey Jur, ASC

References

2018
2018 film awards
2018 television awards
American
2018 in American cinema